Francesca "Fran" Johnnene (died 2015) was a leading anti-busing advocate during the desegregation of Boston's Public Schools in the 1970s. She was an executive of the Association of Neighborhood Schools and a national representative and board member of Restore Our Alienated Rights (ROAR), a Boston-based anti-busing organization. She worked closely with Louise Day Hicks and Elvira "Pixie" Palladino to organize anti-busing rallies, letter writing campaigns, and prayer meetings.

See also
Boston busing crisis
Louise Day Hicks
Restore Our Alienated Rights

External links 

Guide to the Francesca Johnnene collection at the Boston City Archives

Notes 

People from Boston
2015 deaths